Alfredo Narciso is an American actor.

Early life and education
Narciso was born in Milwaukee, Wisconsin to a Brazilian mother and a Filipino father. He showed an interest in acting from a young age. He began acting in middle school and high school, and remembers his first serious role occurring in the 10th grade when he portrayed a Russian spy in the play See How They Run. Narciso attended the University of Wisconsin–Eau Claire where he initially was a poor student. After being academically suspended, his father took him to New York City where he saw several Broadway shows, one of which was Oleanna by David Mamet. After his time in New York, Narciso changed his major from English to theater and excelled as a student.

Career
Throughout his career, Narciso has been involved in a variety of television, stage and film productions. In television, he has played roles on Law & Order, Law & Order: Criminal Intent, Ugly Betty, Third Watch, Tough Crowd with Colin Quinn, Person of Interest, Blue Bloods, Unforgettable and All My Children. He appeared in the 2002 film The Guys with Sigourney Weaver and the 2016 film Jacqueline Argentine with Wyatt Cenac.

On stage, Narciso has performed in the Broadway shows The Motherfucker with the Hat and A Streetcar Named Desire. He has also performed in the Off-Broadway shows Thinner Than Water, Edgewise, Microcrisis, Measure for Measure, Chair, Safe, Drunken City, The Misanthrope and Points of Departure. He has appeared on stage elsewhere in productions including Miracle at Naples, Another Side of the Island, Territories, Britannicus, Much Ado About Nothing, A Very Old Man, and Off the Page.

Filmography

Film

Television

References

External links
 
 

Year of birth missing (living people)
Living people
Male actors from Wisconsin
American people of Brazilian descent
American male actors of Filipino descent
American male television actors
American male stage actors
Male actors of Brazilian descent
People from Milwaukee
University of Wisconsin–Eau Claire alumni